Alfa Bank is a Brazilian commercial bank based in São Paulo. The bank's president is Aloysio de Andrade Faria.

History
The bank dates to 1925, when it was founded as Banco da Lavoura de Minas Gerais, whose name was changed in 1972 to Banco Real. In 1998 its controlling interest was sold to ABN AMRO. The financial companies that weren't sold became Alfa Financial Conglomerate, which later merged with Alfa Bank.

The company was acquired in November 2022 by Banco Safra.

References

External links

http://www.alfanet.com.br/default.aspx?pagid=ELNCONUM&menuid=570

1925 establishments in Brazil
Banks established in 1925
Banks of Brazil
Companies listed on B3 (stock exchange)
2022 mergers and acquisitions